Rhombinella is a genus of sea snails, marine gastropod mollusks in the family Columbellidae, the dove snails.

Species
Species within the genus Rhombinella include:

 Rhombinella laevigata (Linnaeus, 1758)

References

Columbellidae
Monotypic gastropod genera